Jane Barry (born 15 September 1966, Boston, USA) is an international women's rights author and principal at Linksbridge living on Bainbridge Island, Washington, USA.

Personal details
Jane is married and has two daughters, Juliette and Alyssa.

Early career
Barry studied Soviet Studies at Middlebury College, Vermont, USA before moving to California and working on Soviet-American co-operation issues as part of the emerging citizen diplomacy movement, with organisations including the Esalen Institute Soviet-American Exchange Program; just as the Iron Curtain began to fall.

She worked in the former Soviet Union between 1989 and 1994, taking part in counter-demonstrations to the attempted 1991 coup d'etat against Mikhail Gorbachev and in support of democracy; being one of the first foreigners to join the human shield outside the Moscow White House.

Humanitarian work
In 1991, she joined CARE USA, working in Russia on HIV/AIDS issues  and other former Soviet republics including Tajikistan and Georgia during their break-away conflicts.

In 1995, CARE USA posted her to Rwanda to work in the aftermath of the 1994 Rwandan genocide.

From 1995 to 1998, Barry worked in Bosnia and Liberia for CARE  before leaving the organisation to become an independent consultant.

Policy work and women's rights
In her more recent career, she has worked in Côte d'Ivoire, Iraq, Sierra Leone, Chechnya, Kosovo, and South Africa for Save the Children UK,Help Age International, the UK Department for International Development, and the Urgent Action Fund for Women's Human Rights.

Barry's written work has been translated into Albanian, French, Nepali, Serbo-Croatian, Sinhala, Spanish and Tamil, is required reading at Fordham University Institute of International Humanitarian Affairs. She has been described by anti-war movement Women in Black as an "homage to women activists who are engaged throughout the world: from Europe across Africa and Asia to Latin America".

Since 2008, Jane Barry has worked as a principal at the Seattle office of the consulting firm Linksbridge.

Publications
Jane Barry's recent published works include:
A Bridge Too Far: Aid Agencies and the Military in Humanitarian Response (2002) 
Rising up in Response (2005)
What's the Point of the Revolution if We Can't Dance? (2007)
Insiste, Persiste, Resiste, Existe (2008)

References

External links
Commentary on and reviews of Jane Barry's writing
Giving voice to silent emergencies
Voices of Solidarity : International Women Activists Share their Perspective on the Katrina Disaster
Kosovar Women's Voice
The Rory Peck Trust Free Lens
PeaceWomen
Association for Women's Rights in Development (AWID)
UN Non-governmental Liaison Service
The New Humanitarians: A Review of Trends in International Humanitarian Action

1966 births
Living people
American humanitarians
Women humanitarians
American women writers
People from Bainbridge Island, Washington
21st-century American women